D2L (or Desire2Learn) is a Canada-based global software company with offices in Australia, Brazil, Europe, Singapore, and the United States. 

D2L is the developer of the Brightspace learning management system, a cloud-based software suite used by schools, higher educational institutions, and businesses for online and blended classroom learning. The company is also the developer of Open Courses, a Massive Open Online Course platform.  The acronym D2L is short for Desire2Learn.

History

D2L was founded in 1999 by Canadian entrepreneur John Baker, who became president and CEO. He founded D2L while studying systems design engineering during his third year at the University of Waterloo. He was awarded the Meritorious Service Cross in 2017, for his work at the company to advance learning across the country and around the world. The company went public with an initial public offering in November 2021, on the Toronto Stock Exchange.

In November 2022, D2L laid off roughly 5% of it's workforce shortly after reporting second quarter losses of $4.8M.

Developments
In 2004, D2L first introduced support for Competency Based Education, and launched an integrated ePortfolio product to allow learners to document their own learning.  The company became the recipient of the 2012 Platinum Learning Impact Award in the event hosted by IMS Global.  In 2013, D2L was recognized by the National Federation of the Blind for its leadership in Accessibility with the Dr. Jacob Bolotin Award.  Three years later, the company partnered with the National Federation of the Blind's Strategic Nonvisual Access Partner program to ensure learning systems are fully accessible.  That same year, D2L launched a beta of a redesigned interface using responsive web design to offer full functionality on mobile devices, which saw general release in 2017.

Products and services

Brightspace
D2L's first virtual learning environment clients included University of Guelph, Virtual High School (Ontario), the University of Waterloo and Fanshawe College.   

Brightspace was built using microservices and operates as a software as a service. It incorporates Web Components and Google Polymer, HTML5, and responsive web design to provide a user interface that can work on any mobile device.

Brightspace combines a Learning Environment, ePortfolio, Learning Repository, Video Recorder, Virtual Classroom, eTextbook platform called Binder, and Mobile apps, in one cloud-based platform.

In May 2020, Brightspace signed an agreement with Stockholm-based edtech company RepresentEdTech to resell and distribute its cloud-based learning platform in the Nordic region.

Engagement Plus
Engagement Plus combines a cloud-based Lecture Capture system, interactive components for engaging course design, and a Course Catalog/Registration System.

Performance Plus
Performance Plus is a bundle of learning analytics to help automate tasks and identify risks.  An adaptive learning engine personalizes the content for each learner. Learning Analytics and Intelligent Agents provide early intervention to help learners and a set of data that can be used to make improvements based upon analysis.

In 2016, Fast Company recognized D2L as a leader in Data Science.

Open Courses
In 2008, D2L entered the massive open online course MOOC market to support MOOC pioneers Stephen Downes and George Siemens.

The University of Tasmania used D2L's MOOC platform for tens of thousands of learners with more than 70% of those students starting the courses finishing.

Services
D2L's services include: a cloud-based learning system, end-user help desk support, technical account management, technical data management, advisory consulting, program management, training, course development, customization, and accessibility design support.

References

External links

Virtual learning environments
Educational software companies
Learning management systems
Companies based in Kitchener, Ontario
Classroom management software
Companies listed on the Toronto Stock Exchange